Knopaiamoi (Wayana: Konopamïi, Aluku: Konopu amoï) is a mountain in Suriname at . It is part of the Tumuk Humak Mountains and is located in the Sipaliwini District. The mountain is located in the South-eastern corner of Suriname near the borders with French Guiana and Brazil. It was discovered in 1861 by a joint French-Dutch border expedition and originally named Piton Vidal after Gomer Vidal, the leader of the French delegation of the expedition. At first they failed to climb the mountain, and most of the team went on, however Vidal and Keppler stayed behind to give it a second change.

Name 
According to oral tradition, the original Wayana name for the mountain was Tëpuenetop, which has since been replaced by Konopamïi, deriving from the Aluku name Konopu amoï, which means "beautiful button".

Notes

References

External links

Inselbergs of South America
Mountains of Suriname